Eye of Providence is the fourth studio album by Canadian metal band The Agonist. It was released on February 23, 2015 in Europe and the following day in North America. It is the first full-length album featuring vocalist Vicky Psarakis since the departure of founding member and original vocalist Alissa White-Gluz in 2014. The album received general acclaim from critics, with many applauding the utilization of Psarakis' vocals and her distinction from White-Gluz.

Track listing

Personnel
 Vicky Psarakis – vocals
 Danny Marino – lead guitar
 Pascal "Paco" Jobin – rhythm guitar
 Chris Kells – bass
 Simon McKay – drums

Charts

References

2015 albums
Century Media Records albums
The Agonist albums